James Francis Ray (December 1, 1944 – May 26, 2005) was an American right-handed professional baseball pitcher, who played in Major League Baseball (MLB) from 1965–1966 and 1968–1974 for the Houston Astros and Detroit Tigers. 

Born in Rock Hill, South Carolina, he attended Holly High School in Holly, Michigan, and was signed by the Baltimore Orioles in 1963.

The ,  Ray was known as a hard thrower with a stellar fastball and earned the nickname "Ray Gun" during the  season when he struck out 115 batters in 115 innings. Two years later, he appeared in 47 games played for the 1971 Astros, all but one in relief, and won ten of 14 decisions with a 2.12 earned run average (ERA). He was traded along with Gary Sutherland from the Astros to the Tigers for Fred Scherman at the Winter Meetings on December 3, 1973. For his career, Ray appeared in 308 Major League games, all but 20 in relief, and notched 25 saves.

Ray died on May 26, 2005 in Margate, Florida.

References

External links

1944 births
2005 deaths
Amarillo Sonics players
Baseball players from South Carolina
Bluefield Orioles players
Columbus Astros players
Denver Bears players
Detroit Tigers players
Durham Bulls players
Fox Cities Foxes players
Houston Astros players
Major League Baseball pitchers
Oklahoma City 89ers players
People from Rock Hill, South Carolina
San Antonio Bullets players